Dr. Rovenia M. Brock, also known as Dr. Ro, is an American nutritionist, lecturer, health reporter, entrepreneur, and author.

Career
Brock made her television debut as host of BET's Heart and Soul. She worked as a nutrition coach on The View, helping co-host Sherri Shepherd lose 41 pounds. She is currently a nutritional adviser on The Dr. Oz Show.

Brock partnered with McDonald's in 2005, to promote physical activity.

Radio and podcast work 
Brock is nutrition contributor to National Public Radio (NPR).

She launched a podcast, Dr. Ro on Demand, in 2019.

Home video 
Brock was executive producer, creator and host of Dr. Ro's Fit Kidz, a health and fitness children's DVD series. l

Works

 Dr. Ro’s Ten Secrets To Livin’ Healthy (2004) 
 Lose Your Final 15: Dr. Ro's Plan to Eat 15 Servings A Day & Lose 15 Pounds at a Time (2016)

References

External links
 everything Ro, official website
 

1956 births
Living people
African-American writers
People in alternative medicine
American health and wellness writers
American women non-fiction writers
American women nutritionists
American nutritionists
Howard University alumni
Virginia State University alumni
American television journalists
American women television journalists
21st-century African-American people
21st-century African-American women
20th-century African-American people
20th-century African-American women